Stive Vermaut (22 October 1975 – 30 June 2004) was a Belgian cyclist.

Cycling career
Vermaut was born in Ostend. He turned professional in 1998 with the team , after riding with them as a stagiaire the previous year. In 1999, he won a stage of the Circuit des Mines and placed sixth in the Circuito Montañés and Cholet-Pays de Loire, ninth in the Tour de l'Avenir, and tenth in the Grand Prix de Wallonie and the Deutschland Tour. In 2000, he joined the American team , led by Belgian Johan Bruyneel. In 2001, he joined the Belgian team . He participated in the Tour de France, where he finished 36th overall. 

With heart problems early in the 2002 season, he was forced to stop cycling. Medical examinations revealed that he suffered from tachyarrhythmia and the right part of his heart was overdeveloped. The team's doctor declared him unfit to ride. In July, Vermaut received word from another doctor that he was fit to ride again. He joined Palmans–Collstrop for the remainder of the season, but ended his career at the end, as new problems were arising.

Death
In June 2004, Vermaut was transported unconscious to Roeselare Hospital following a heart attack. He died there a few days later of a brain haemorrhage.

Major results

1996
1st De Drie Zustersteden
1997
3rd Overall Volta a Lleida
1st Stage 1
1999
1st Stage 8 Circuit des Mines
6th Overall Circuito Montañés
6th Cholet-Pays de Loire
9th Overall Tour de l'Avenir
1st  Mountains Classification
10th Overall Deutschland Tour
10th Grand Prix de Wallonie

References

1975 births
2004 deaths
Belgian male cyclists
Sportspeople from Ostend
Cyclists from West Flanders